Playing with Fire: Dungeons and Dragons, Tunnels and Trolls, Chivalry and Sorcery, and other Fantasy Games is a book written in 1984 by John Weldon and James Bjornstad and published by Moody Press that tries to show that fantasy role-playing games like Dungeons & Dragons are anti-Christian.

Contents
In the early 1980s, some religious groups accused TSR, the publisher of Dungeons & Dragons, of encouraging sorcery and the veneration of demons. This was exacerbated in 1982, when Patricia Pulling's son killed himself. Pulling blamed D&D for her son's suicide, and formed an organization named B.A.D.D. (Bothered About Dungeons & Dragons) to attack the game and the company that produced it. 

In 1984, the Christian publisher Moody Publishing released Playing with Fire, a 91-page book by John  Weldon and James Bjornstad that was critical of tabletop role-playing games, attempting to prove that role-playing games are morally ambiguous and dangerous for young, impressionable minds.   

Playing with Fire was subsequently favorably quoted by other Christian publications including Demon Possession and the Christian (C. Fred Dickason, Crossway, 1989) and Encyclopedia of New Age Beliefs (John Ankerberg & John Weldon, Moody Publications, 1996).

Reception
In the May-June 1985 edition of The Space Gamer (No. 74), Steve LaPrade commented that "Like it or not, RPGers, parents are reading this book or hearing from those who have. It has been prominently displayed in religious bookstores and in some regular bookstores. If gamers want to see the shape of a threat to their hobby, this book is it. Because of its information value – plus a good bibliography of RPG newspaper and magazine articles – gamers may find it a worthwhile investment of their time and money, especially if RPGs are under attack in their home town."

References

1984 non-fiction books
Books about role-playing games
Collaborative non-fiction books